The Roundabout Theatre Company is a non-profit theatre company based in Midtown Manhattan, New York City, affiliated with the League of Resident Theatres.

History
The company was founded in 1965 by Gene Feist, Michael Fried and Elizabeth Owens. Originally housed at a Chelsea, Manhattan, grocery store, on 26th Street, it moved to the nearby 23rd Street Theatre in 1972, performing there until their lease expired in 1984. The company now operates five theatres, all in Manhattan: the American Airlines Theatre (for classic Broadway plays and musicals); Studio 54 (for Broadway musicals and special events); the Stephen Sondheim Theatre (originally Henry Miller's Theatre, which was rebuilt in 2009 and incorporated the theater's original facade); the Laura Pels Theatre (for new off-Broadway works by established playwrights); and the Roundabout Underground Black Box Theatre (for new work of emerging writers and directors). The latter two theatres are located in the Harold and Miriam Steinberg Center for Theatre (the former American Place Theatre). The Center was developed, with financial support from the Steinbergs, "to support its artistic mission of fostering emerging talent in playwriting, performance, and stagecraft."

Previously, Roundabout also occupied 44 Union Square.

Production history

Criterion Center Stage Right
1991–1999:
 1991: The Homecoming
 1992: The Visit, Hamlet, The Price, The Fifteen Minute Hamlet and The Real Inspector Hound, The Show Off
 1993: Anna Christie, Candida, She Loves Me, White Liars and Black Comedy, Rodgers and Hammerstein's A Grand Night for Singing 1994: No Man's Land, Picnic, Hedda Gabler, Philadelphia, Here I Come!, The Glass Menagerie 1995: The Molerie Comedies—The School for Husbands and The Imaginary Cuckold, A Month in the Country, The Play's the Thing, Company 1996: The Father, The Night of the Iguana, A Thousand Clowns, Summer and Smoke, The Rehearsal 
 1997: Three Sisters, London Assurance, 1776, A View from the Bridge 
 1998: The Deep Blue Sea, Side Man 1999: Little Me, The Lion in WinterAmerican Airlines Theatre

 2000: The Man Who Came to Dinner, Betrayal, Design for Living 2001: Major Barbara, The Women, The Man Who Had All the Luck 2002: The Boys from Syracuse, Tartuffe, A Day in the Death of Joe Egg, As Long as We Both Shall Laugh, An Almost Holy Picture 2003: Big River, The Caretaker, Twentieth Century 2004: After The Fall, Twelve Angry Men 2005: The Constant Wife, A Naked Girl on the Appian Way, The Pajama Game 2006: Heartbreak House, Prelude to a Kiss 2007: Old Acquaintance, Pygmalion, The 39 Steps, Les Liaisons dangereuses 2008: A Man for All Seasons, Hedda Gabler 2009: The Philanthropist, After Miss Julie 2010: Present Laughter, Everyday Rapture, Mrs. Warren's Profession 2011: The Importance of Being Earnest, Man and Boy 2012: The Road to Mecca, Cyrano de Bergerac, Don't Dress for Dinner 2013: Picnic, The Big Knife, The Winslow Boy 2014: Machinal, Violet, The Real Thing 2015: On the Twentieth Century, Old Times with Clive Owen, Noises Off 2016: Long Day's Journey into Night with Jessica Lange, The Cherry Orchard with Diane Lane
 2017: Arthur Miller's The Price, Marvin's Room, Time and the Conways 2018: John Lithgow: Stories by Heart, Travesties, Bernhardt/Hamlet 2019: True West, All My Sons, The Rose Tattoo 2020: A Soldier's Play 2021: Trouble in Mind 2022: Birthday Candles, 1776Studio 54

 1998: Cabaret 2004: Assassins 2005: Pacific Overtures, A Streetcar Named Desire 2006: A Touch of the Poet, The Threepenny Opera 2007: The Apple Tree, 110 in the Shade 2008: The Ritz, Sunday in the Park with George 2009: Pal Joey, Waiting for Godot, Wishful Drinking 2010: Sondheim on Sondheim, Brief Encounter 2011: The People in the Picture 2012: Harvey, The Mystery of Edwin Drood 2014: Cabaret; An Act of God 2015: Thérèse Raquin with Keira Knightley
 2016: She Loves Me, Holiday Inn 2017: Sweat, Latin History for Morons 2018: Children of a Lesser God, The Lifespan of a Fact 2019: Kiss Me, Kate 2021: Caroline, or Change 2022: The MinutesLaura Pels Theatre
 2004: The Foreigner 2005: Mr. Marmalade, Entertaining Mr Sloane, Pig Farm, The Paris Letter 2006: Suddenly Last Summer, Howard Katz, The Home Place 2007: The Overwhelming, Crimes of the Heart 2008: Streamers, Distracted, Tin Pan Ally Rag 2009: The Understudy 2010: The Language Archive 2011: The Milk Train Doesn't Stop Here Anymore, Death Takes a Holiday 2012: If There Is I Haven't Found It Yet, Look Back in Anger 2013: Bad Jews, Talley's Folly 2014: Dinner with Friends, Just Jim Dale, Indian Ink 2015: Into the Woods, Significant Other, The Humans 2016: The Robber Bridegroom; Love, Love, Love 2017: Napoli, Brooklyn; If I Forget; The Last Match 2018: Amy and the Orphans; Skintight, Apologia 2019: Merrily We Roll Along, Toni Stone, Scotland, PAGramercy Theatre
 1999: Ashes to Ashes, Hurrah at Last 2000: Hotel SuiteStephen Sondheim Theatre

2009: Bye Bye Birdie2010: All About Me, The Pee-wee Herman Show2011: Anything Goes2013: The Trip to Bountiful2014: Beautiful: The Carole King Musical'
2019: Slava's Snowshow
2021: Mrs. Doubtfire

Awards

Drama Desk Awards
 1993:	Revival of a Play – Anna Christie
 1994:	Musical Revival – She Loves Me
 1998:	Revival of a Musical – Cabaret
 1998:	Revival of a Play – A View from the Bridge
 2003:	Revival of a Musical – Nine
 2004:	Revival of a Musical – Assassins
 2005:	Revival of a Play – Twelve Angry Men
 2008:	Unique Theatrical Experience – The 39 Steps
 2011:	Revival of a Musical – Anything Goes
 2016:	Revival of a Musical – She Loves Me
 2016:	Outstanding Play – The Humans

Laurence Olivier Awards 
 1995; Best Musical Revival – She Loves Me

Lucille Lortel Awards
Roundabout productions have received 9 Lucille Lortel Awards. Derek McLane and Catherine Zuber won Outstanding Set and Costume Design Awards for 2004's Intimate Apparel. Reg Rogers won an Outstanding Actor award for 2002's The Dazzle. Kenneth Posner won an Outstanding Lighting Design Award for 2000's Give Me Your Answer, Do!. Robert Brill with Scott Pask, Jess Goldstein, and Kevin Adams won Awards for Outstanding Set, Costume, and Lighting Design for 1999's The Mineola Twins. 1998's All My Sons won an award for Outstanding Revival. 1996's Molly Sweeney won an award for Outstanding Play of the Season.

Theatre World Awards
29 performers in Roundabout productions have won Theatre World Awards, which honors achievement in "breakout" performances. Winners are Christopher Goutman in 1979's The Promise, Boyd Gaines in 1981's A Month in the Country, Lisa Banes in 1981's Look Back in Anger, Anthony Heald in 1982's Misalliance, Kate Burton in 1983's Winners, Mark Capri in 1985's On Approval, Lindsay Crouse in 1992's The Homecoming, Natasha Richardson and Liam Neeson in 1993's Anna Christie, Calista Flockhart and Kevin Kilner in 1995's The Glass Menagerie, Helen Mirren in 1995's A Month in the Country, Alfred Molina in 1996's Molly Sweeney, Helen Carey in 1997's London Assurance, Alan Cumming in 1998's Cabaret, Henry Czerny in 2000's Arms and the Man, Juliette Binoche in 2001's Betrayal, David Warner in 2002's Major Barbara, Victoria Hamilton in 2003's A Day in the Death of Joe Egg, Antonio Banderas and Mary Stuart Masterson for 2003's Nine, Alexander Gemignani in 2004's Assassins, Carla Gugino in 2005's After the Fall, Mamie Gummer in 2006's Mr. Marmalade, Nellie McKay in 2006's The Threepenny Opera, Harry Connick Jr. in 2006's The Pajama Game, Ben Daniels in 2008's Les Liaisons dangereuses, and Jenna Russell in 2008's Sunday in the Park with George.

Tony Awards
 1993:	Revival – Anna Christie
 1998:	Revival of a Musical – Cabaret
 1998:	Revival of a Play – A View from the Bridge
 1999:	New Play – Side Man
 2003:	Revival of a Musical – Nine
 2004:	Revival of a Musical – Assassins
 2005:	Revival of a Play – Glengarry Glen Ross
 2006:	Revival of a Musical – The Pajama Game
 2011:	Revival of a Musical – Anything Goes
 2016:	New Play – The Humans

Obie Awards
They have won 8 Obie Awards. 2004's Intimate Apparel, 2003's All Over, 2002's The Dazzle, 1999's The Mineola Twins, and 1981's The Chalk Garden won Performance Awards for Viola Davis, Rosemary Harris, Peter Frechette and Reg Rogers, Swoosie Kurtz, and Irene Worth respectively. Emily Mann also won a Direction Obie Award for 2003's All Over. Most recently, Amy Ryan won in 2017 for her performance in Love, Love, Love.

Other awards
Roundabout has received 41 Outer Critics Circle Awards.

References

External links
 Roundabout Theatre Company official website
 "A Roundabout Way to Broadway", 50th anniversary film, presented by Neil Patrick Harris
  (sole venue, 1972–1984)
 
 Gene Feist papers, 1930s–2000. Billy Rose Theatre Division, New York Public Library

1965 establishments in New York City
Drama Desk Award winners
Theatre companies in New York City
Tony Award winners
Drama Desk Award-winning plays
Obie Award recipients
Laurence Olivier Award-winning plays
Non-profit organizations based in New York City
Off-Broadway
Broadway theatre